Wangting East railway station is a reserved railway station on the Shanghai–Nanjing Intercity Railway located in Jiangsu, People's Republic of China.

Railway stations in Suzhou